Shudo Junior and Senior High School (修道中学校・修道高等学校) is a university-preparatory school for boys located in Hiroshima City. It is one of the oldest high schools in Japan, with a history of over 290 years. The school was founded within the Hiroshima Castle by the Fifth Lord of Hiroshima Domain (広島藩), Yoshinaga Asano, in 1725. Shudo was originally the Domain School (藩校) teaching sons of samurais in the feudal domain, but was changed to a private school by the Twelfth Lord, Nagakoto Asano, in 1878. The school, students and teachers suffered severely from the atomic bomb dropped on Hiroshima City in 1945.

Shudo is known as one of the prestigious schools in Japan. Shudo has educated generations of Japanese statesmen, bureaucrats, artists, professors, businessmen and athletes including Tomosaburo Kato, 12th Prime Minister of Japan, and Kōji Kikkawa, rock musician and actor.

Football, swimming and climbing teams of the school have won the All Japan High School Championships several times. Shogi (Japanese chess) and Shodo (Japanese calligraphy) teams also have become the national champions.

Notable alumni 
 Tomosaburo Kato, 12th Prime Minister of Japan, Admiral of the Fleet
 Shizuka Kamei, Minister of Exports and Minister of Construction
 Tetsuo Saito, Minister of Environment
 Seizō Kobayashi, Minister of State, Governor-General of Taiwan, Commander of the Combined Fleet
 Masaaki Fujita, President of the House of Councillors
 Keizō Nozaki, Attorney General, Member of the House of Lords
 Yūzan Fujita, Governor of Hiroshima Prefecture
 Sukeyuki Ban, Mayor of Hiroshima City
 Setsuo Yamada, Mayor of Hiroshima City
 Takeshi Araki, Mayor of Hiroshima City
 Tadashi Satō, Mayor of Hiroshima City
 Daisuke Matsumoto, Member of the House of Representatives
 Yoshitake Masuhara, Member of the House of Representatives
 San'yō Rai, Confucianist philosopher, historian, artist and poet
 Hakaru Masumoto, Physicist, pioneer in metal and alloy research
 Akinori Noma, Physiologist, discoverer of ATP-sensitive potassium channel
 Yoshiaki Yoshimi, historian
 Kazuo Tsukuda, CEO of Mitsubishi Heavy Industries
 Kōhei Matsuda, CEO of Mazda Motor Corporation 
 Kazuyoshi Kino, Buddhist scholar
 Ikuo Hirayama, Traditional Japanese-style painter
 Sōkei Ueda, 16th grand master of Ueda Sōko-ryū tea ceremony school 
 Minoru Sasaki, Lieutenant-General of Imperial Army, commander at Battle of New Georgia
 Yōzō Kaneko, Major-General of Imperial Navy, founder of Imperial Navy Air Service
 Kenji Fukui, Television announcer
 Kazuhiko Yukawa, screenwriter
 Daisuke Nishio, Animator and director
 Keiichi Nanba, Anime voice actor
 Kōji Kikkawa, Rock musician and actor
 Tobi, Singer, composer and lyricist of Les Romanesques 
 Tatsugo Kawaishi, Olympic swimming medalist dead in the Battle of Iwo Jima
 Kentaro Kawatsu, Olympic swimming medalist
 Tsutomu Ōyokota, Olympic swimming medalist
 Hiroshi Nagata, Olympic medalist of field hockey
 Takaji Mori, Olympic football medalist
 Ryota Yamagata, Olympic medalist of sprint relay
 Yukio Shimomura, Football player, member of Olympic national team

See also
Meanings of minor planet names: 9001–10000 (Minor planet 9436 was named Shudo after this school).
Secondary education in Japan
Higher education in Japan

References

External links
  

Schools in Hiroshima Prefecture
Junior high schools in Japan
High schools in Hiroshima Prefecture
Educational institutions established in 1725
University-preparatory schools
Private schools in Japan
Hiroshima
1725 establishments in Japan